The Gymnazium Union of Russia is a government-backed open network of Russian gymnaziums, lyceums and secondary schools.

The Union was introduced by Andrei Fursenko, the Russian Education Minister, on November 6, 2007, at a major conference in education held at Saint Petersburg State University.

The Union is sponsored and broadly supported by the Russian Foundation for Education Support, a Gazprom's non-profit foundation. It makes a part of the National Priority Projects and is directly supported by Russian President Dmitry Medvedev and the Russian Ministry of Education.

The infrastructure of the Union relies on videoconferencing and allows to hold discussion meetings between member schools, befriended universities and research institutions, and the headquarters of the Foundation for Education Support.

As of early April 2008, the Union brings together about 100 schools in all seven federal Russian districts and rapidly grows.

Members

Central Federal District

Belgorod Oblast
 Gymnazium 2, Belgorod (profile, website)
 Lyceym 3, Stary Oskol (profile, website)
 A.M. Rudy Borisov School 1, Borisov (profile, website)

Bryansk Oblast
 Gymnazium 1, Bryansk (profile, website)

Kaluga Oblast
 Obninsk Gymnazium, Obninsk (profile)

Kostroma Oblast
 Lyceum 3, Galich (profile, website)

Moscow Oblast and the Federal City of Moscow
 Gymnazium 1583, Moscow (profile)

Orel Oblast
 Livny S.N. Bulgakov Lyceum, Livny (profile)

Tambov Oblast
L.S. Demin Kadetsky Korpus, Tambov-4 (profile, website)
Michurinsk Lyceum-Boarding School, Michurinsk (profile, website)
Saint Pitirim Gymnazium 7, Tambov (profile, website)
Uvarovo Lyceum, Uvarovo (profile, website)

Tula Oblast
Gymnazium 1, Tula (profile)

Tver Oblast
 Gymnazium 8, Tver (profile, website)
 Gymnazium 2, Nelidovo (profile, website)

Yaroslavl Oblast
 Gymnazium 3, Yaroslavl (profile, website)

Northwestern Federal District

Arkhangelsk Oblast
 Gymnazium 21, Arkhangelsk (profile, website)
 Gymnazium 6, Arkhangelsk (profile, website)
 Lyceum 17, Severodvinsk (profile, website)
 Severodvinsk City Gymnazium, Severodvinsk (profile)
 Yagrinskaya Gymnazium, Severodvinsk (profile, website)
 Humanities Gymnazium 8, Arkhangelsk (profile)
 M.V. Lomonosov Lyceum, Arkhangelsk (profile)
 Novodvinsk Gymnazium, Novodvinsk (profile)
 Ecological and Biological Lyceum, Arkhangelsk (profile)

Kaliningrad Oblast
 Gymnazium 22, Kaliningrad (profile, website)

Komi Republic
 Gymnazium 2, Vorkuta (profile)

Leningrad Oblast
Vyborg Gymnazium, Vyborg (profile)
Lyceum 1, Vsevolozhsk (profile, website)
Lyceum 8, Sosnovy Bor (profile)
Gatchina K.D. Ushinsky Gymnazium (profile, website)

Nenets Autonomous Okrug
 Secondary School 1, Naryan-Mar (profile)
 A.P. Pyrerki Boarding School, Naryan-Mar (profile, website)

Pskov Oblast
 Lyceum 10, Velikiye Luki (profile)
 Lyceum 11, Velikiye Luki (profile, website)
 Humanities Lyceum, Pskov (profile, website)
 Izborsk Lyceum, Izborsk (profile)
 Multiprofile Law Lyceum 8, Pskov (profile, website)
 Pedagogical Lyceum, Velikiye Luki (profile)
 Pechory Gymnazium, Pechory (profile, website)
 Pechory Secondary School 2, Pechory (profile, website)
 Pskov Linguistic Gymnazium, Pskov (profile, website)
 Pskov Pedagogical Complex, Pskov (profile)
 Pskov Technical Lyceum, Pskov (profile)

Federal City of Saint Petersburg
 Second Saint Petersburg Gymnazium, Saint Petersburg (profile, website)
 Gymnazium 41, Saint Petersburg (profile, website)
 Gymnazium 11, Saint Petersburg (profile, website)
 Gymnazium 513, Saint Petersburg (profile, website)
 Gymnazium 528, Saint Petersburg (profile, website)
 Gymnazium 622, Saint Petersburg (profile, website)
 Gymnazium 107, Saint Petersburg (profile, website
 Gymnazium 295, Saint Petersburg (profile, website)
 Lyceum 150, Saint Petersburg (profile, website)
 Lyceum 590, Saint Petersburg (profile, website)
 Pedagogical College 1, Saint Petersburg (profile, website)
 Pedagogical College 8, Saint Petersburg (profile, website)
 Saint Petersburg Marine Technical College, Saint Petersburg (profile, website)
 Kadetsky Korpus Zheleznodorozhnykh Voisk, Petergof (profile, website)
 Akademicheskaya Gimnaziya (website)
 Saint Petersburg Lyceum 239, Saint Petersburg (website)

Vologda Oblast
 Girls' Humanities Gymnazium, Cherepovets (profile, website)
 Gymnazium 2, Vologda (profile, website)
 Cadets' Boarding School, Sokol (profile, website)
 Vologda Multiprofile Lyceum, Vologda (profile, website)
 Veliky Ustyug Gymnazium, Veliky Ustyug (profile, website)
 Ustyuzhna Gymnazium, Ustyuzhna (profile)

Southern Federal District

Astrakhan Oblast
 Gymnazium 3, Astrakhan (profile, website)

Krasnodar Krai
 Evrika Gymnazium, Anapa (profile, website)
 Gymnazium 6, Tikhoretsk (profile)

Rostov Oblast
 Gymnazium 25, Rostov-on-Don (profile, website)

Stavropol Krai
 Gymnazium 4, Pyatigorsk (profile, website)
 Lyceum 5, Stavropol (profile, website)

Volga Federal District

Republic of Bashkortostan
 Bashkirsky Lyceum, Sibai (profile, website)
 Duvanski Rayon RLI, Mesyagutovo (profile, website)
 Sterlitamak Lyceum-Boarding School 2, Sterlitamak (profile)
 Lyceum 1, Bolsheustyinskoye (profile, website)
 Gymnazium 14, Beloretsk (profile, website)

Chuvash Republic
 Gymnazium 6, Novocheboksarsk (profile, website)
 Gymnazium 8, Shumerlya (profile)

Mari El Republic
 RME Urgaksh Lyceum-Boarding School, Urgaksh (profile)
 Kosmodemyansk Gymnazium, Kosmodemyansk (profile)
 Kosmodemyansk Lyceum, Kosmodemyansk (profile)

Orenburg Oblast
 Gymnazium 2, Orsk (profile, website)
 Gymnazium 4, Orenburg (profile, website)

Ulyanovsk Oblast
 Undory General Lyceum, Undory (profile, website)

Urals Federal District

Tyumen Oblast
 Secondary School 8, Noyabrsk (profile, website)

Siberian Federal District

Republic of Buryatia
 Gymnazium 33, Ulan Ude (profile, website)
 Kurumkan Lyceum, Kurumkan (profile)

Irkutsk Oblast
 Secondary School 9, Ust-Ilimsk (profile, website)

Krasnoyarsk Krai
 Gymnazium 164, Zelenogorsk (profile, website)

Far Eastern Federal District

Sakha Republic
 Aldan Gymnazium, Aldan (profile, website)
 Gymnazium 1, Neryungri (profile, website)
 Maya Gimnazium, Maya (profile, website
 Pokrovsk Gymnazium, Pokrovsk (profile)

References

External links
 Gymnazium Union of Russia's website 
 Website of the Foundation for Education Support 
 Gymnazium Union unites Russian gymnaziums nationwide. NTV  
 Forum of Gymnanium Union of Russia opened in Saint Petersburg. Rosbalt. 
 Memorandum of Understanding between Russian Education Minister Andrei Fursenko and the Foundation President Tatyana Golubeva. February 11, 2008. 

Foundations based in Russia
Education in Russia